Louis Melville Roberts (December 15, 1879 – February 11, 1958) was an American-Canadian politician from Alberta.

Early life
Louis Melville Roberts was born December 15, 1879 to Scottish parents in Cedar County, Iowa. He attended the University of Iowa completing a Bachelor of Laws. He married Helen Atkinson on July 12, 1906 and had two children together.

Roberts constructed "Roberts Block", a three-storey brick warehouse on 11th Avenue in Calgary in 1909, which remains standing to this day.

Political life

Louis was elected to the Legislative Assembly of Alberta in the 1909 Alberta general election, for the Alberta Liberal Party. During his campaign he was accused of winning the High River nomination under suspect circumstances. Louis would win a hotly contested election knocking off future High River Conservative MLA George Douglas Stanley by 8 votes.

Louis served 1 term in the Assembly.

References

External links

Cheers for Roberts, High River Times March 18, 1909
Legislative Assembly of Alberta Members Listing

Alberta Liberal Party MLAs
People from Cedar County, Iowa
American emigrants to Canada
University of Iowa College of Law alumni
1879 births
1958 deaths